Holzheim Castle may refer to the following castles in Germany:

 Holzheim Castle (Haunetal), county of Hersfeld-Rotenburg, Hesse
 Holzheim Castle (Langerwehe), county of Düren, North Rhine-Westphalia

See also 
 Holzheim House (Schloss Holzheim), a manor house in the municipality of Leonding, Linz-Land, Austria
 Holzheim Hunting Lodge, county of Hersfeld-Rotenburg, Hesse, Germany